Makó (Makowe,  or) is a town in Csongrád County, in southeastern Hungary,  from the Romanian border. It lies on the Maros River. Makó is the fourth-largest town in Csongrád County after Szeged, Hódmezővásárhely and Szentes.

The climate is warmer than anywhere else in Hungary, with hot, dry summers. The town is noted for its onion which is a hungarikum, the spa and the thermal bath. The Makó International Onion Festival, the largest of its kind, is held annually. Makó is a popular tourist destination in Hungary.

The Makó gas field, located near the town, is the largest natural gas field in Central Europe. The gas volume is more than 600 billion cubic metres (21 trillion cubic feet), according to a report by the Scotia Group.

The town's floodplain forests are protected as part of Körös-Maros National Park.

Economy 
The economy is based on agriculture. The town is noted for its production of onions and garlic. Both the climate and the soil structure make the town and its surroundings an ideal place for onion farming. Onions have been cultivated in the region since the 16th century. The first records of significant garlic production date to the late 18th century. International recognition of the garlic grown in Makó has been widespread since the Vienna Expo in 1873 and the Brussels Expo in 1888.

The mud of the Maros River has similar properties to some of the best in Hungary and the world; at times it is likened to that of the Dead Sea. The local spa has been one of the main tourist attractions since 1961.

With the political changes in 1989, after the break-up of the Soviet Union, Makó lost jobs in industry. Unemployment has risen in the area, to an estimated 8% in the early 21st century, and is considered a serious issue. Farmers have also suffered more economic difficulties. The town has established an industrial park to encourage that development, and the town hopes to build on its site as "The South-Eastern Gate of the European Union".

Makó has become known in the early 21st century for the nearby Makó Trough, a basin-centered gas accumulation that could be one of the largest natural gas fields in continental Europe. As of March 2007, it was not clear whether the gas can be recovered economically from this area. At the 90% probability rate, Makó had certified recoverable resources of over 600 billion cubic meters of natural gas, according to a report by the Scotia Group. This was prepared for the field's exploration concession holder, the Canada-based Falcon Oil and Gas.

History 
Makó used to be the capital of Csanád, a historic administrative county (comitatus) of the Kingdom of Hungary.

Noted Hungarian people were born or have lived in Makó. Perhaps the most prominent is the American publisher and journalist, Joseph Pulitzer, who was born to a Jewish family here on April 18, 1847. Emigrating to the United States when young, he developed as a publisher, owning and operating two newspapers in the United States: in Saint Louis, Missouri and New York City; bequeathed funds to Columbia University to establish its school of journalism, and endowed the Pulitzer Prizes in journalism and photography, as well as literature, art and music.

Jewish history 

Makó developed a Jewish community beginning in the 18th century. The Orthodox synagogue was reconstructed during the years 1999-2002 and reopened on 10 March 2002.

Jews began to settle in Makó about the middle of the 18th century, under the protection of Stanislavich, the Bishop of Csanád. In 1740, he assigned a special quarter where they soon formed a community, and by 1747 had established a Chevra kadisha.

The first rabbi of Makó was Judah ben Abraham ha-Levi (who occupied the rabbinate from 1778 to 1824). He was succeeded by Salomon Ullman (1826–63). Ullman wrote a commentary on certain sections of Yoreh De'ah, under the title "Yeri'ot Shelomoh" (Vienna, 1854). He was followed by Anton Enoch Fischer (1864–96), former rabbi of Dunaföldvár. Fischer introduced German and (later) Hungarian in his sermons, when the community still spoke mostly Yiddish. In 1904 the rabbi was Dr. A. Kecskemeti".

The community established a Jewish school in Makó in 1851, of which Marcus Steinhardt was a teacher for forty years. The community also set up a Jewish Women's Association, a Jewish students' aid society, and a Jewish women's lying-in hospital.

In 1900, Makó had 1,642 Jews, less than 5% of the total city population of 33,722. The community was destroyed during the Holocaust. The Jewish population was deported to extermination camps, where most were killed in the last year of the war.

Geography 
The former community pasture of the town near the Maros River has been preserved as part of the Körös-Maros National Park. The traditional name of the area, Csordajárás, expresses its historic use as grazing ground for cattle.

Climate
Makó and the surrounding region get the most sunshine in Hungary, about 85-90 sunny days a year. The sun shines more than 2,100 hours a year in Makó.

Notable residents and natives

Politics
 Lajos Návay (1870-1919), jurist, politician, Speaker of the House of Representatives (1911-1912)
 Andrea Mágori, politician
 Béla Bánhidy, politician
 László Szászfalvi, politician
 Ferenc Erdei, politician
 József Kristóffy, politician, Interior Minister (1905–1906)

Science
 Geza de Kaplany, physician
 Béla H. Bánáthy (1919–2003), Hungarian-American linguist, systems scientist, educator, founder of White Stag Leadership Development Program in California
 József Galamb (1881–1955), Hungarian-American engineer
 Peter Lantos (born 1939), medical scientist and writer
 Moritz Löw (1841–1900, Steglitz, Berlin), Jewish Hungarian-German astronomer

Religion
 Géza Vermes (born 1924-2013), Jewish theologian, orientalist
 Meshulim Feish Lowy, Grand Rebbe of the Tosh Hasidic dynasty
 Vasile Erdeli, Romanian bishop of the Diocese of Oradea Mare (1843-1862)
 Sándor Rosenberg, neolog rabbi

Media/Art/Entertainment
 Tamás Kátai (born 1975), musician
 Antal Páger (1899-1986), actor
 Katalin Berek (1930–2017), actress
 István Dégi (1935–1992), actor
 Bea Palya (born 1976), singer
 Joseph Pulitzer (1847–1911), Hungarian-American journalist, publisher and philanthropist
 Albert Pulitzer (1851-1909), Hungarian-American journalist, teacher
 Andre DeToth, Hungarian-American film director
 André de Toth (1912–2002), Hungarian-American producer
 Emil Makai (1871–1901, Budapest), Hungarian poet
 Jenő Barcsay, painter

Sports
 József Sütő, long-distance runner
 Marko Milošević, Bosnian footballer, football manager
 Gábor Gyömbér, footballer
 Zsolt Gévay, footballer
 Krisztina Pigniczki, handballer
 Zsolt Huszárik, footballer
 Tamás Szélpál, footballer
 András Dlusztus, footballer
 László Köteles, footballer

Twin towns – sister cities

Makó is twinned with:

 Ada, Serbia
 Atça (Sultanhisar), Turkey
 Bodo (Balinț), Romania
 Dumbrava, Romania
 Jasło, Poland
 Kiryat Yam, Israel
 Lugoj, Romania
 Martinsicuro, Italy
 Maumee, United States
 Miercurea Ciuc, Romania
 Radomsko, Poland

 Rusko Selo (Kikinda), Serbia
 Sânnicolau Mare, Romania
 Xinyang, China
 Želiezovce, Slovakia

See also 
Downtown Primary School, Elementary Arts Educational Institution and Logopedical Institute

References

External links

  in Hungarian
 Makó at funiq.hu 

Populated places in Csongrád-Csanád County
Shtetls
Holocaust locations in Hungary